Dieter Moherndl (born 20 January 1968) is a German snowboarder. He competed in the men's giant slalom event at the 1998 Winter Olympics.

References

External links
 

1968 births
Living people
German male snowboarders
Olympic snowboarders of Germany
Snowboarders at the 1998 Winter Olympics
People from Traunstein (district)
Sportspeople from Upper Bavaria
20th-century German people